Patti is a traditional  caste of Herdsmen from Sri Lanka’s feudal past. They were a part of the feudal land tenure system and a sub-caste of the Govigama caste. Found in the highlands and the maritime provinces but now mostly merged into the Govigama caste.

References
 Ryan Bryce 1953 Caste in Modern Ceylon, Rutgers University Press
 Ceylon Gazetteer 1855

Sinhalese castes